Darryl Plecas (born in 1951) is a Canadian  politician, who was a Member of the Legislative Assembly of British Columbia for Abbotsford South from 2013 to 2020, and served as Speaker of the Legislative Assembly of British Columbia from 2017 to 2020. He was first elected to the Legislative Assembly in the 2013 provincial election as a member of the British Columbia Liberal Party; after 2017 he sat as an independent after the BC Liberal Party revoked his membership for accepting his election as Speaker.

Background 
Plecas holds two degrees in Criminology from Simon Fraser University, and a doctorate in Higher Education from the University of British Columbia.

Plecas is a criminologist and emeritus faculty member at the University of the Fraser Valley, where he worked for 34 years, and helped turn the criminal justice program from a college diploma into a fully credited degree program. During this time, he also served as a federally appointed prison judge.

Political career 
Plecas served as Parliamentary Secretary to the Minister of Justice and Attorney General for Crime Reduction from June 10, 2013 to January 29, 2015. He was appointed Parliamentary Secretary to the Minister of Health for Seniors on January 30, 2015.

At a Liberal caucus meeting held in July 2017, shortly after the government of Christy Clark lost power following its defeat in a confidence vote, Plecas called for Clark's resignation as party leader and threatened to quit the Liberal caucus and sit as an Independent MLA if she remained.

Later that month, Clark announced her resignation as leader. When Plecas revealed his role in Clark's ouster to The Abbotsford News, NDP house leader Mike Farnworth approached Plecas about becoming speaker. Had he accepted, it would have strengthened the hand of the NDP minority government. Clark had unsuccessfully pressed for a new election due to the prospect of an NDP speaker having to frequently use his casting vote to break 43-43 ties.

Plecas and Farnworth negotiated in secret for much of July before reaching a deal in late August, with only Premier John Horgan and a few senior staffers aware of their talks. On September 8, 2017, he was acclaimed as Speaker. On the following day, the Liberals expelled Plecas upon the request of the Abbotsford South BC Liberal riding association, and Plecas served out his term as an independent.

Plecas later told The Province that he initially had no desire to be speaker, but changed his mind after concluding that there was no basis for Liberal claims that an NDP minority government supported by the Greens would be illegitimate. He said that with his earlier experience as a prison judge, he had the ability to be "impartial in difficult circumstances."

Legislative Assembly corruption scandal
In the year after being appointed Speaker, Plecas grew suspicious of the conduct of two Permanent Officers of the B.C. Legislative Assembly: Clerk Craig James and Sergeant-at-Arms Gary Lenz. He brought the matter before the Legislative Assembly Management Committee (LAMC), who urged the Speaker to publicize the corruption claims. The alleged crimes were reported to the Royal Canadian Mounted Police prior to the report's publication. A criminal investigation was launched by the RCMP. The preliminary report on the issue was published on January 21, 2019.

The Plecas Report cited expenses "in the range of a million dollars" to the Legislative Assembly for personal use, in the period of 20 months between April 2017 and December 2018. James and Lenz charged the legislature for a variety of luxury goods and inappropriate travel costs. They were also accused of questionably awarding themselves hundreds of thousands of dollars in employment benefits (e.g. retirement allowances and life insurance). Plecas raised concern about employer malpractice by James and Lenz, and attempts to conceal information related to their high expenditures. James in particular was noted for the theft of alcohol, and the contents of departing Premier Christy Clark's parliamentary vault.

James and Lenz denied the allegations of the report, and both submitted a written defense to the LAMC. James retired in May 2019, after an external administrative report conducted by former Supreme Court Justice Beverly McLachlin determined his actions amounted to professional misconduct in several areas. Though the same report did not substantiate claims of misconduct by Lenz, a subsequent external investigation found he had lied during the McLachlin investigation, and that he had further neglected his duties as outlined by the Police Act. Shown a copy of the report days before its public release, Lenz resigned.

Electoral record

2017 election

2013 election

References

External links
Darryl Plecas

British Columbia Liberal Party MLAs
Living people
Canadian criminologists
People from Abbotsford, British Columbia
Simon Fraser University alumni
Speakers of the Legislative Assembly of British Columbia
University of British Columbia alumni
Year of birth uncertain
21st-century Canadian politicians
Independent MLAs in British Columbia
1950s births
Academic staff of the University of the Fraser Valley